Sapo National Park is a national park in Sinoe County, Liberia. It is the country's largest protected area of rainforest,
was the first national park established in the country,
and contains the second-largest area of primary tropical rainforest in West Africa after Taï National Park in neighbouring Côte d'Ivoire.
Agriculture, construction, fishing, hunting, human settlement, and logging are prohibited in the park.

Sapo National Park is located in the Upper Guinean forest ecosystem,
a biodiversity hotspot that has "the highest mammal species diversity of any region in the world", according to Conservation International,
and in the Western Guinean lowland forests ecoregion, according to the World Wide Fund for Nature's ecoregions classification scheme.

History

Designation and early history
In 1976, the Liberian Forestry Development Authority was created to manage and preserve the country's forest resources. A year later, in 1977, the Division of Wildlife and National Parks was formed under the leadership of Alexander Peal, who served as its head until 1990.
By 1982, seven protected areas has been proposed in Liberia, including three national parks. Of these, only Sapo National Park — named after the local Sapo (or Sao) tribe — was formally designated, in 1983,
by the People's Redemption Council.
The park's original boundaries were set and its management plan drafted by the Division of Wildlife and National Parks, in cooperation with the World Wildlife Fund, the World Conservation Union, and the Peace Corps.

Throughout its history, Sapo National Park has been threatened by illegal farming, hunting, logging, and mining, "all exacerbated by the country's grinding poverty" and social and political instability. However, in the early 1990s, the World Conservation Monitoring Centre reported that "[rural development projects around the park and general acceptance of its existence have helped to minimise potential conflicts." Until the 1990s, poaching was limited due to various initiatives, funded by the United States Agency for International Development, that made local villagers stakeholders to the park's preservation.

Civil war in Liberia
During the First Liberian Civil War, Sapo National Park fell into the hands of rebel forces, and much of the park's infrastructure and equipment was damaged or destroyed,
including a wildlife rehabilitation and orphanage facility constructed in 1989 and supported by Friends of Animals. Of 33 park employees, at least three were killed and seven became refugees. The extent of illegal resource extraction from inside the park during the period of rebel control is disputed. John Terborgh, a professor of environmental science and biology at Duke University, writes that "[l]ogging was rampant during the war".
However, Peal reported that logging was limited, and that farming and hunting pressures were minimised, by population displacement — including the exodus of people out of over two dozen villages surrounding the park — and the prevailing climate of insecurity, to the extent that species populations actually increased during the war years.
William Powers, a Catholic Relief Services official posted to Liberia from 1999 to 2001, noted that the Park was a war-time haven for small groups of people, who scavenged for food and hunted bushmeat to survive.
Logging and poaching became more common after the war's end in 1996.

In 2002, allegations surfaced that President Charles Taylor had sold concessions worth several millions of United States dollars to a Hong Kong-based timber company — the Oriental Timber Company — to conduct logging within the boundaries of the park. The funds were reportedly pocketed by Taylor or used to secure the loyalty of various senior commanders, to arm loyalist forces embroiled in the Second Liberian Civil War (1999–2003), and to acquire mercenary fighters from South Africa.
Liberia's Minister of Information, Reginald Goodridge, denied the allegations, noting that no evidence of logging was found during a National Geographic Society team's two-week visit to the park.

Post-war developments
Fauna and Flora International and the World Wildlife Fund (WWF) worked with Liberia's Forestry Development Authority and the Society for the Conservation of Nature of Liberia (SCNL) to prepare a two-year initiative to restart management of the park. Mainly funded by the Darwin Initiative of the United Kingdom's Department for Environment, Food and Rural Affairs and the World Wildlife fund from 2000–2002, the objectives of the initiative were to re-establish the park's management, build support for the park among the local community, and to build Liberia's capacity in conservation management and planning. The SCNL also received a grant from the Whitley Foundation to begin a programme to monitor the park's large mammals.

There has been very slow progress in the establishment of protected areas in Liberia. Sapo National Park, proclaimed in 1983, was the country's first protected area. The act recognised the park as being "at the core of an immense forests block of the Upper Guinea Forest Ecosystem that is important to the conservation of the biodiversity of Liberia and of West Africa as a whole".
The  East Nimba Nature Reserve (ENNR), on the border with Guinea and Côte d'Ivoire, was created at the same time to become Liberia's second protected area.

The peace that followed the conclusion of the Second Liberian Civil War gave rise to new threats to the park. Groups of fighters and civilians moved into the park during the final months of the conflict — some to escape the conflict and others to harvest timber or prospect for gold.
The influx of people into the park continued after the war's end, eventually growing into a full-scale gold rush. Accompanying or following the prospectors were hunters, many of them former combatants, who poached the park's animals to sell as meat to the settlers.
By March 2005, an estimated 5,000 people lived in the park, according to the United Nations Mission in Liberia. Although efforts were undertaken to remove the illegal squatters, the park was not completely emptied until late August-early September 2005, and then only through the participation of conservationists, the Liberian government, and United Nations peacekeeping forces.

Due to its remote location and the near-complete absence of tangible amenities, such as visitor housing or recreational facilities, there are few visitors to Sapo National Park.
Entry into the park is prohibited without approval from the Forestry Development Authority. No roads lead into the park, so it can be reached only on foot.
The park also has no trails.

Geography and climate
The park is bounded to the north by the Putu Mountains and to the west by the Sinoe River. The park's quite homogeneous, flat and marshy topography supports a large area of uninhabited forest. There are many small streams and rivers between these ridges. Sinoe River is the largest river in the park. Mount Putu's  summit is the highest elevation in the park.

The park has a tropical climate, with temperatures ranging between 22–28 °C (72–82 °F). The forest's average relative humidity is 91%. The park's dry season occurs from November to April and the wet season lasts from May to October. January and December are the driest months in the park, and May and August are the wettest months. There is a mid-dry period of decreased rainfall in July, which occasionally extends into August. During the dry season, many of the smaller streams dry up and their sandy and rocky stream beds are exposed. The dry season also causes the larger rivers shrink in size, exposing waterfalls and sandbars.

Biodiversity

Flora
Liberia has the largest remaining part of the Upper Guinean forest ecosystem, with an estimated 42% of the remaining forest. The rest of the Upper Guinean forest is located in Côte d'Ivoire (28% of the remaining forest), Ghana (16%), Guinea (8%), Sierra Leone (5%), and Togo (1%). Just an estimated 40-45% of Liberia's original forest cover remains, and less than 30% of its area is covered by natural forest. Its tracts of forest were once continuous, but are now fragmented into blocks that are isolated from each other as a result of logging, road-building, cultivation, and human settlements. Before the civil war, the Forestry Development Authority calculated that about 35% of Liberia's original forest was "undisturbed", 45% was "disturbed but productive", and 20% was "disturbed and unproductive." Sapo National Park's forest is one of the country's last remaining blocks of tropical lowland rain forest, and one of West Africa's least disturbed lowland rainforests. It is the second-largest area of primary tropical rainforest in West Africa after Taï National Park in Côte d'Ivoire.

The park has one of the richest amounts of floral species in the country, with many endemic species. A 1983 survey of the park determined it to be composed of 63% primary and mature secondary forest, 13% swamp forest, 13% seasonally inundated forest, and 11% young secondary forest. Plant species found in the park include the legumes Tetraberlinia tubmaniana and Gilbertiodendron splendidum, and the tree Brachystegia leonensis.

Fauna

Sapo National Park is a "regional centre of endemism"
and biodiversity, at one time hosting around 125 mammal species and 590 types of bird, including a number of threatened species,
such as the African golden cat, Gola malimbe, Liberian mongoose, white-breasted guineafowl, and white-necked rockfowl. The park is also home to the African civet, African fish eagle, grey parrot, giant forest hog, great blue turaco, speckle-throated otter,
water chevrotain, three species of pangolin, seven species of monkey (including the endangered Diana monkey), crocodiles, leopards,
bee-eaters, egrets, hornbills, kingfishers, rollers, and sunbirds.

Prior to the formal designation of Sapo National Park in 1983 there had been "no systematic study of chimpanzee populations in Liberia". Since then, various surveys have confirmed the existence of the common chimpanzee (Pan troglodytes) in Sapo National Park, located primarily in the park's center and western areas, with estimates of the population ranging from 500 to 1,640. The culture of the local Sapo people includes a reverence for the chimpanzee and, therefore, a taboo against their hunting.

Seven species of duiker antelopes are found in Sapo National Park, including the vulnerable Jentink's duiker (Cephalophus jentinki) and zebra duiker (Cephalophus zebra). bay duikers (Cephalophus dorsalis) and Maxwell's duikers (Cephalophus maxwellii) are reported to be locally abundant.

Sapo National Park contains populations of the pygmy hippopotamus (Hexaprotodon liberiensis), an endangered species which has legal protection in Liberia under the Wildlife and National Park Act of 1988. Unique to West Africa, the wild population of pygmy hippopotamuses is thought to number less than 3,000 individuals. According to the World Conservation Union (IUCN), conservation efforts targeted at the species have "historically been most effective in the Sapo National Park ... where protection is good". According to an action plan published by the IUCN Species Survival Commission, Sapo National Park is "the only realistic choice" of a "of suitable conservation area" for the Pygmy Hippopotamus. In February 2008, automatic heat- and motion-sensing cameras set up in Sapo National Park captured the first photographs of the pygmy hippopotamus ever taken in Liberia.
The photographs confirmed the continued presence of the species inside the boundaries of the park; previously, scientists did not know whether the pygmy hippopotamus population in the park had survived the civil wars and subsequent poaching and logging.

The endangered African forest elephant (Loxodonta cyclotis) is also present in Sapo National park, with population estimates ranging from "as many as 500" for the early 1980s to between 313
and 430
for the end of the decade; however, the IUCN considers the most recent surveys — both of which relied on dung counts — to be of low quality and reliability.

See also
 List of national parks in Africa
 Wildlife of Liberia

References

National parks of Liberia
Sinoe County
Protected areas established in 1983